Pimelea argentea, commonly known as silvery leaved pimelea, is a species of flowering plant in the family Thymelaeaceae and is endemic to the south-west of Western Australia. It is an erect shrub with densely hairy young stems and leaves, the leaves linear to elliptic, and heads of white to yellow or greenish flowers, the male and female flowers on separate plants.

Description
Male and female flowers are white to yellow or greenish, and borne on separate plants.

Taxonomy and naming
Pimelea argentea was first formally described in 1810 by Robert  Brown in his book Prodromus Florae Novae Hollandiae et Insulae Van Diemen. The specific epithet (argentea) means "silvery".

Distribution and habitat
Silvery leaved pimelea mostly grows in sand and is found on coastal dunes and in rocky granite areas from the Murchison River to Israelite Bay and inland as far as Hyden.

Conservation status
Pimelea argentea is listed as "not threatened" by the Government of Western Australia Department of Biodiversity, Conservation and Attractions.

References

argentea
Malvales of Australia
Flora of Western Australia
Plants described in 1810
Taxa named by Robert Brown (botanist, born 1773)